Blossoms of Fire (also known as Ramo de fuego) is a 2000 documentary film about the people of Juchitán, Oaxaca, Mexico. The documentary was directed by Maureen Gosling and Ellen Osborne.

Overview
Author Elena Poniatowska described the women of Juchitán de Zaragoza, a city in the Mexican state of Oaxaca, as “guardians of men, distributors of food.” Artists like Miguel Covarrubias and Frida Kahlo celebrated their beauty and intelligence. Blossoms of Fire shows them in their daily lives as they run their own businesses, embroider their signature fiery blossoms on clothing and comment on articles in the foreign press that depict them as a promiscuous matriarchy. In particular, an article in the Latin American version of ELLE Magazine infuriated the community during the time the filmmakers were shooting in 1994. Yet, it is expressed throughout the film by the women that they do not consider their society to be a matriarchy.

The people interviewed in this film share a common work ethic and independent streak rooted in Zapotec culture. The movie demonstrates powerful women, the region’s progressive politics, and a tolerance of homosexuality. Veteran film editor and former Les Blank collaborator Maureen Gosling and co-director Ellen Osborne tell of an indigenous community whose "flair for survival in the modern world is a fighting spirit and the undeniable influence of women."

Scenes
 A midwife laughs over a young husband’s behavior during birth,
 A gay man cheerfully asserts that “the mom’s in charge” in Juchitecan society
 Many proudly describe the challenges they face in their work and their families.

Honors and special screenings
 World Premiere - San Francisco International Film Festival, Castro Theater, SF and Pacific Film Archive, Berkeley
 Coral Prize for Best Foreign Documentary About Latin America: Havana International Film Festival, Havana, Cuba.
 "Best Of"Sunnyside of the Doc Film Market, Marseille, France
 Award for Excellence - Society for Visual Anthropology, American Anthropological Association
 Best Documentary - Film Fest New Haven, Conn.
 Second Prize, Community Category, Terres en Vues First People's Festival,  Montréal, Québec
 Prix Union Latine, Competition - La Cita Festival de Biarritz, Biarritz, France
 El Foro de la Cineteca Nacional, Mexico City, Mexico (One of 12 international films chosen to screen at this prestigious Forum.) The film toured Mexico with the other films for three months following.
 HBO Frame by Frame Series, The Screening Room, Manhattan
 Tour of the Mexican Republic, including Juchitán, Oaxaca, Mexico City, and dozens of venues in the southern Mexican states. Sponsored by the Mexican Film Institute (IMCINE). May–June 2001.
 HDerHumALC (Human Rights) Film Festival, Buenos Aires, Argentina.
 Toured with festival films to Lima, Peru (Dec. 2002)
 World Social Justice Forum in Porto Alegre and Belem, Brazil (Jan. 2003).

Credits

 Producer, Director, Editor - Maureen Gosling
 Director, Co-Producer - Ellen Osborne
 Co-Producers - Toni Hanna, Maria Teresa García de la Noceda
 Cinematographer - Xavier Pérez Grobet
 Sound Recordist - Gabriela Espinoza
 Field Producer - Susana Vásquez Sánchez
 Associate Producer - Kelly Clement
 Fiscal Sponsor - Film Arts Foundation, San Francisco
 Featuring - the People of Juchitán and San Blas Atempa, Oaxaca

References

External links
 

2000 films
2000s English-language films
2000s Spanish-language films
Mexican documentary films
2000 documentary films
Documentary films about women
Documentary films about Mexico
Women in Mexico
2000 multilingual films
American multilingual films
Mexican multilingual films
Spanish-language American films
2000s Mexican films